The Brass Bottle is a 1923 American silent fantasy comedy film produced and directed by Maurice Tourneur and distributed by First National Pictures. The original 1900 novel The Brass Bottle by Thomas Anstey Guthrie was produced as a Broadway play in 1910. A 1914 silent followed. Both silent versions are lost. A 1964 adaptation starred Tony Randall and Barbara Eden.

Cast
Harry Myers as Horace Ventimore
Ernest Torrence as Fakresh-el-Aamash
Tully Marshall as Professor Hamilton
Clarissa Selwynne as Mrs. Hamilton
Ford Sterling as Rapkin
Aggie Herring as Mrs. Rapkin
Charlotte Merriam as Sylvia Hamilton
Edward Jobson as Samuel Wackerbath
Barbara La Marr as The Queen
Otis Harlan as Captain of the Guard
Hazel Keener
Julanne Johnston
Roy Coulson as One-eyed evil spirit (uncredited)

References

External links

Window card The Brass Bottle (item sold on eBay; but scroll down to bottom of page for reserved image of lobby card)

1923 films
American silent feature films
Lost American films
Films directed by Maurice Tourneur
American films based on plays
Genies in film
1920s fantasy comedy films
Films based on British novels
Films based on multiple works
First National Pictures films
American black-and-white films
American fantasy comedy films
1923 comedy films
1920s American films
Silent American comedy films
Silent horror films
1920s English-language films